Exotic Materials can include plastics, superalloys, semiconductors, superconductors, and ceramics.

Exotic metals and alloys 
Examples of metals and alloys that can be exotic:
Aluminum
Nickel
Chromium
Cobalt
Copper
Hastelloy
Inconel
Mercury (element) (aka quicksilver, hydrargyrum)
Molybdenum
Monel
Platinum
Stainless steel
Tantalum
Titanium
Tungsten or Wolframite
Waspaloy
Materials with high alloy content, known as super alloys or exotic alloys, offer enhanced performance properties including excellent strength and durability, and resistance to oxidation, corrosion and deforming at high temperatures or under extreme pressure. Because of these properties, super alloys make the best spring materials for demanding working conditions, which can be encountered across various industry sectors, including the automotive, marine and aerospace sectors as well as oil and gas extraction, thermal processing, petrochemical processing and power generation.

Notes

Materials